The office of the Victims' Commissioner for England and Wales is an organization of the government of the United Kingdom. The role of the Victims' Commissioner is to promote the interests of victims and witnesses of crime, encourage good practice in their treatment, and regularly review the Code of Practice for Victims which sets out the services victims can expect to receive.

The organization was created under the Domestic Violence, Crime and Victims Act 2004 and Louise Casey was appointed as the first Victims' Commissioner in 2010, following the one-year appointment of Sara Payne as Victims' Champion. Her successor was Baroness Newlove of Warrington, a Warrington-based community reform campaigner, who was appointed in 2012.The Commissioner appointed in May 2019, and in office 23 June 2019 to 30 September 2022 was Dame Vera Baird.

References

External links 
 

Public bodies and task forces of the United Kingdom government